The 1805 Club was founded in 1990 to accomplish three objectives. To assist in the preservation of monuments and memorials relating to Vice- Admiral Lord Horatio Nelson and seafarers of the Georgian era. To promote research into the Royal Navy of the Georgian period, and especially of Vice Admiral Lord Nelson. To organize cultural and historical events.

1805 originates from the year of the Battle of Trafalgar, 21 October 1805. Club chairman since 2019 is Gerald W (Bill) White. The club is a registered charity number 1071871 in England & Wales.

Restoration efforts
The club restored the imposing churchyard memorial of Admiral Home Popham at St Michael and All Angels Church, Sunninghill, Berkshire, in 1999. In the same year it restored the tomb of Admiral Sir Sidney Smith in Père Lachaise Cemetery, Paris.

In 2006 it was reported that the 1805 club restored the grave of Capt Edward Berry, buried at St Swithin's Church in Walcot as part of their Trafalgar Captains' Memorial Project.

In 2008, it was reported that the 1805 club restored the grave of Capt John Richards Lapenotière RN, at Menheniot Parish Church near Liskeard. The club also recorded the graves of all the British commanding officers at Trafalgar and raised funds to repair seven that were found to be in poor condition. The 1805 club documented the graves in their book, The Trafalgar Captains: Their Lives and Memorials.

Cultural events
According to The Times, the club conducted a 200th anniversary memorial service at the tomb of Lord Nelson. Senior members of the Royal Navy, the Sea Cadets and HMS Victory's Cutter Crew were in attendance. The club vice-president, Mrs Anna Tribe, a 3rd great-granddaughter of Lord Nelson and Lady Emma Hamilton, laid a wreath at Nelson's tomb during the service.

The 1805 Club is also the official custodian of The Trafalgar Way from Falmouth to the Old Admiralty in London and has recently been awarded Libor funds by the Chancellor to further its activities.

Publications

The 1805 Club maintains a website with historical information about the Royal Navy and other state and merchant navies during the eighteenth and early nineteenth centuries and concentrating on Lord Nelson and his fellow seamen, including a list of over seventy links to other Naval research databases.

The 1805 Club also publishes the following:

 Trafalgar Chronicle, its annual maritime history journal, currently edited by Dr. Judith Pearson, Dr. Sean Heuvel and Captain John Rodgaard USN(Rtd).  Issued free to members, or may be purchased by non-members.
 The Kedge Anchor, its twice-yearly printed magazine, issued free to members.
 The 1805 Dispatches, a regular digital newsletter, available to anybody interested, via The 1805 Club website.

The 1805 Club has also published monographs, including: 

 Nelson and the Campaign in Corsica, by Tom Pocock. 
 The Battle of Cape St Vincent, by Colin White. 
 Nelson and Tenerife 1797, by Agustin Guimera. 
 The Miller Papers, by Kirstie Buckland.
 Touch and Take: The Battle of Trafalgar 21 October 1805, by Michael Duffy. 
 The Trafalgar Captains: Their Lives and Memorials, by Colin White, leader of a team of 1805 club writers.

See also
Monuments and memorials to Horatio Nelson, 1st Viscount Nelson

References

External sources
 The 1805 Club Website
   Admiral Lord Nelson Home Page

Maritime history of the United Kingdom
History organisations based in the United Kingdom
Organizations established in 1990
Naval history

Historical societies of the United Kingdom
1990 establishments in the United Kingdom